Atqasuk Edward Burnell Sr. Memorial Airport  is an uncontrolled public use airport located one nautical mile (2 km) south of the central business district of Atqasuk, a city in North Slope Borough, Alaska, United States. The airport is owned by North Slope Borough.

As per Federal Aviation Administration records, the airport had 2,105 passenger boardings (enplanements) in calendar year 2008, 2,107 enplanements in 2009, and 2,499 in 2010. It is included in the National Plan of Integrated Airport Systems for 2011–2015, which categorized it as a general aviation facility (the commercial service category requires at least 2,500 enplanements per year).

Facilities and aircraft 
Atqasuk Edward Burnell Sr. Memorial Airport resides at elevation of 101 feet (31 m) above mean sea level. It has one runway designated 6/24 with a gravel surface measuring 4,370 by 90 feet (1,332 x 27 m). For the 12-month period ending January 1, 2006, the airport had 530 aircraft operations, an average of 44 per month: 94% air taxi and 6% general aviation.

Airlines and destinations 

Prior to its bankruptcy and cessation of all operations, Ravn Alaska served the airport.

Statistics

References

External links 
 Alaska FAA Airport Diagram (GIF)
 Topographic map from USGS The National Map
 

Airports in North Slope Borough, Alaska